Collingswood is a borough in Camden County, in the U.S. state of New Jersey, located  east of Center City Philadelphia. As of the 2020 United States census, the borough's population was 14,186, an increase of 260 (+1.9%) from the 2010 census count of 13,926, which in turn reflected a decline of 400 (−2.8%) from the 14,326 counted in the 2000 census.

Owing in part to its Quaker history, Collingswood was founded as a dry town where alcohol cannot be sold, however restaurant patrons are permitted to bring their own wine and beer to consume. In July 2015, the town introduced an ordinance that allows craft breweries to operate in the town but not serve food. The ordinance passed in August 2015.

Collingswood is well known for its selection of shops and restaurants primarily along Haddon Avenue and was ranked as the "#1 small-town food scene in America" by USA Today in May 2018.

History

The land in what is present day Collingswood was originally inhabited by Lenni Lenape Native Americans. Quakers from England and Ireland settled along Newton Creek and Cooper River in the late 17th century, establishing what was known as the Newton Colony and eventually Newton Township. Much of what is now Collingswood was a farm owned by members of the Collings family during the 18th and 19th centuries. Later a section of Haddon Township, Collingswood was incorporated as a borough by an act of the New Jersey Legislature on May 22, 1888, based on the results of a referendum held that same day. That same year, town resident Edward Collings Knight, a wealthy sugar, real estate and railroad magnate, donated the land that became Knight Park. Knight was a descendant of the Collings family for whom the borough is named.

Collingswood has several historic homes including the 1820s-era house of the Collings family, known as the Collings-Knight homestead, which stands at the corner of Browning Road and Collings Avenue, shadowed by the Parkview at Collingswood apartment homes. The Stokes-Lees mansion located in the 600 block of Lees Avenue dates back to 1707, making it one of the oldest houses in Camden County. Sections of Harleigh Cemetery, the location of poet Walt Whitman's tomb, are in Collingswood,.

Geography

According to the United States Census Bureau, the borough had a total area of 1.95 square miles (5.04 km2), including 1.83 square miles (4.74 km2) of land and 0.12 square miles (0.30 km2) of water (5.90%).

Unincorporated communities, localities and place names located partially or completely within the borough include Knight Park.

Collingswood shares land borders with Camden, Cherry Hill, Haddon Township, Oaklyn, Pennsauken Township and Woodlynne.

The Cooper River serves as the northern border of Collingswood and Newton Creek as the southern border.

Demographics

2020 census
The 2020 United States census counted 14,186 residents in Collingswood. The median household income was $73,594 in 2015–2019 according to the American Community Survey.

2010 census

The Census Bureau's 2006–2010 American Community Survey showed that (in 2010 inflation-adjusted dollars) median household income was $58,769 (with a margin of error of +/− $4,635) and the median family income was $74,236 (+/− $8,567). Males had a median income of $54,088 (+/− $5,121) versus $48,816 (+/− $4,244) for females. The per capita income for the borough was $34,126 (+/− $2,577). About 10.7% of families and 12.2% of the population were below the poverty line, including 19.5% of those under age 18 and 7.9% of those age 65 or over.

2000 census
As of the 2000 United States census there were 14,326 people, 6,263 households, and 3,463 families residing in the borough. The racial makeup of the borough was 86.47% White, 6.67% African American, 0.34% Native American, 2.76% Asian, 0.02% Pacific Islander, 2.42% from other races, and 1.33% from two or more races. Hispanic or Latino of any race were 5.67% of the population.

There were 6,263 households, out of which 25.6% had children under the age of 18 living with them, 38.2% were married couples living together, 13.1% had a female householder with no husband present, and 44.7% were non-families. 36.6% of all households were made up of individuals, and 14.0% had someone living alone who was 65 years of age or older. The average household size was 2.27 and the average family size was 3.05.

In the borough the population was spread out, with 21.8% under the age of 18, 8.6% from 18 to 24, 32.9% from 25 to 44, 22.3% from 45 to 64, and 14.4% who were 65 years of age or older. The median age was 37 years. For every 100 females, there were 88.6 males. For every 100 females age 18 and over, there were 85.8 males.

The median income for a household in the borough was $43,175, and the median income for a family was $57,987. Males had a median income of $40,423 versus $30,877 for females. The per capita income for the borough was $24,358. About 3.8% of families and 6.1% of the population were below the poverty line, including 6.8% of those under age 18 and 7.2% of those age 65 or over.

Arts and culture

Collingswood's retail district is anchored by Haddon Avenue, a section of County Route 561 which runs from Camden to Haddonfield. Collingswood's downtown is known primarily for its restaurants, which span a variety of cuisines including American, Italian, Indian, French, Chinese, Mexican, Brazilian, Hawaiian, Japanese, Ecuadorian, and Thai. The American Planning Association designated Haddon Avenue as one of its 10 Great Streets for 2009. The group chose the street "for the way it melds the past with the present", making Collingswood the first New Jersey community to be cited under the association's Great Places in America program.

On Saturdays from May to November, the borough hosts a farmers' market under the PATCO line, featuring local produce, baked goods, and crafts.

Collingswood sponsors a bike share program, a community greenhouse, as well as a composting program. Beginning in 2009, Collingswood hosts a Green Festival to raise awareness of environmental responsibility.

Monthly "2nd Saturdays" have the borough's art galleries, stores and restaurants hosting new exhibitions by local, national, and international painters, sculptors, and photographers. In 2002, the Moorestown based Perkins Center for the Arts opened a second location in Collingswood.

The borough is home to two theater companies, the Collingswood Community Theatre and the Collingswood Shakespeare Company which perform throughout the year. The Ballroom and Theater at Collingswood hosts local theatrical productions as well as national recording artists such as Ben Folds and The Beach Boys.

The Rutgers University-Camden based Symphony in C orchestra's administrative and box offices are located on Haddon Avenue.

The annual Collingswood Book Festival hosts various authors including Camille Paglia and Matthew Quick, whose novel The Silver Linings Playbook is set in the borough (with scenes in Oaklyn, Voorhees and the city of Philadelphia), though David O. Russell's film adaptation was set in Delaware County, Pennsylvania and Philadelphia.

Art Within Reach is a program that offers handmade items produced by local artists, with all profits going to the artists. With the 2014 season, the shows are held twice each year at The Factory.

Collingswood has a large LGBTQ community and Mayor Jim Maley was one of a handful of New Jersey mayors to perform midnight civil union ceremonies the day New Jersey's Civil Union law took effect in 2006; in 2013 Mayor Maley performed a number of same sex marriages at the Scottish Rite ballroom after same-sex marriage was recognized in New Jersey. In 2004, The Philadelphia Inquirer wrote about the borough's "fast growing gay and lesbian community," and the statewide LGBT advocacy and education organization Garden State Equality maintained a Southern New Jersey office in Collingswood until 2010.

In 2022, Collingswood was ranked 3rd by USA Today among places with the "Best Small Town Cultural Scene."

Parks and recreation
Knight Park is the home to daytime recreation of the town. It is located across the street from Collingswood High School and it hosts the home games of the high school's sports teams, such as women's field hockey, lacrosse, baseball and softball. During the summer months, the borough offers outdoor movies and classical concerts in the park.

Government

Local government
Collingswood operates under the Walsh Act form of New Jersey municipal government. The borough is one of 30 municipalities (of the 564) statewide that use the commission form of government. The governing body is comprised of three commissioners who are elected at-large on a non-partisan basis in elections held as part of the May municipal election to serve concurrent four-year terms of office. Each commissioner is assigned a specific department to head in addition to their legislative functions. The commissioners select one of their members to serve as mayor. The Borough of Collingswood has operated under the Walsh Act since 1917.

, members of Collingswood's Board of Commissioners are 
Mayor M. James "Jim" Maley Jr. (Commissioner of Public Affairs and Public Safety), 
Robert Lewandowski (Commissioner of Revenue and Finance), and
Morgan Robinson (Commissioner of Public Works, Parks and Public Property), all of whom are serving terms of office ending May 15, 2025. In December 2020, Commissioner Joan Leonard announced that she would retire "in early 2021" after 24 years of service to the borough.

In September 2011, the borough experienced a "super downgrade" of its credit rating by Moody's, from A1 to Ba1, as a result of an outstanding multi-million dollar loan guarantee to a property developer. Moody's Investors Service issued a report in late May 2012 that restored the Borough of Collingswood's credit rating to an investment grade rating of Baa3.

Federal, state and county representation
Collingswood is located in the 1st Congressional District and is part of New Jersey's 6th state legislative district.

Politics
As of March 2011, there were a total of 9,825 registered voters in Collingswood, of which 4,269 (43.5%) were registered as Democrats, 1,345 (13.7%) were registered as Republicans and 4,193 (42.7%) were registered as Unaffiliated. There were 18 voters registered as Libertarians or Greens.

In the 2016 presidential election Democrat Hillary Clinton received 74.9% of the vote (5,255 votes), ahead of Republican Donald Trump, who received 24.9% of the vote (1,752 votes), with other candidates receiving 6.5% of the vote (457 votes). 7,519 total votes were cast among the district's 10,535 registered voters in the 2016 election, yielding a 71.4% turnout.

In the 2012 presidential election, Democrat Barack Obama received 70.8% of the vote (4,927 cast), ahead of Republican Mitt Romney with 27.2% (1,892 votes), and other candidates with 2.0% (139 votes), among the 7,006 ballots cast by the borough's 10,585 registered voters (48 ballots were spoiled), for a turnout of 66.2%. In the 2008 presidential election, Democrat Barack Obama received 69.4% of the vote (5,192 cast), ahead of Republican John McCain, who received around 27.3% (2,038 votes), with 7,478 ballots cast among the borough's 10,305 registered voters, for a turnout of 72.6%. In the 2004 presidential election, Democrat John Kerry received 63.6% of the vote (4,629 ballots cast), outpolling Republican George W. Bush, who received around 33.9% (2,467 votes), with 7,277 ballots cast among the borough's 9,527 registered voters, for a turnout percentage of 76.4.

In the 2013 gubernatorial election, Democrat Barbara Buono received 48.8% of the vote (1,822 cast), ahead of Republican Chris Christie with 48.7% (1,819 votes), and other candidates with 2.5% (95 votes), among the 3,809 ballots cast by the borough's 10,702 registered voters (73 ballots were spoiled), for a turnout of 35.6%. In the 2009 gubernatorial election, Democrat Jon Corzine received 56.6% of the vote (2,482 ballots cast), ahead of both Republican Chris Christie with 33.8% (1,483 votes) and Independent Chris Daggett with 6.5% (285 votes), with 4,382 ballots cast among the borough's 9,831 registered voters, yielding a 44.6% turnout.

Education
The Collingswood Public Schools serve students in pre-kindergarten through twelfth grade. As of the 2021–22 school year, the district, comprised of nine schools, had an enrollment of 2,264 students and 200.4 classroom teachers (on an FTE basis), for a student–teacher ratio of 11.3:1. Schools in the district (with 2021–22 enrollment data from the National Center for Education Statistics) are 
Collingswood Preschool with 57 students at Penguin and 43 at Oaklyn in PreK, 
James A. Garfield Elementary School with 131 students in grades K-5, 
Mark Newbie Elementary School with 138 students in grades K-5, 
Thomas Sharp Elementary School with 189 students in grades PreK-5, 
William P. Tatem Elementary School with 244 students in grades K-5, 
Zane North Elementary School with 149 students in grades K-5, 
Collingswood Middle School with 526 students in grades 6-8 and 
Collingswood High School with 777 students in grades 9-12.

Students in ninth through twelfth grades from Woodlynne attend Collingswood High School as part of a sending/receiving relationship with the Woodlynne School District. Students in grades six through 12 from Oaklyn attend the middle and high school as part of a sending/receiving relationship with the Oaklyn Public School District.

Good Shepherd Regional Catholic School is an elementary school that operates under the auspices of the Roman Catholic Diocese of Camden. On April 17, 2020, the Diocese of Camden announced that Good Shepherd was one of five Catholic schools in New Jersey which would close permanently at the end of the school year on June 30, 2020.

Transportation

Public transportation
The Collingswood PATCO Speedline Park and Ride station links the town to Camden and Philadelphia by elevated rail.

Collingswood is also served by NJ Transit local routes 403, 450, and 451 to Camden.

Roads and highways

U.S. Route 30 and U.S. Route 130 are the main highways serving Collingswood. County Route 561 also passes through the borough locally called Haddon Avenue.

Media
The Retrospect, a weekly newspaper with an online component covering local news in Collingswood and surrounding communities, is headquartered on Haddon Avenue. In addition, Patch Media has a Collingswood hyperlocal website. Collingswood is in the Philadelphia media market.

Notable people

People who were born in, residents of, or otherwise closely associated with Collingswood include:

 John Aglialoro (born 1943), business executive, film producer, libertarian activist
 Richard V. Allen (born 1936), National Security Advisor during the Reagan Administration, senior fellow at the Hoover Institution
 Arthur E. Armitage (1891–1981), founder of the College of South Jersey and South Jersey Law School (now Rutgers University-Camden)
 B. J. Averell (born 1979), actor and winner of The Amazing Race 9
 Ted Brown (1924–2005), New York City radio personality
 Victoria Budinger (born 1952), best known as "Miss Vicki", wife of Tiny Tim
 William T. Cahill (1912–1996), Governor of New Jersey from 1970–1974
 Don Casey (born 1937), former head coach of the Los Angeles Clippers and the New Jersey Nets who started his coaching career at Bishop Eustace
 Michael Corbett (born 1956), author and actor
 Jacqueline R. Crahalla (born 1940), former member of the Pennsylvania House of Representatives
 Marguerite de Angeli (1889–1987), children's author
 William K. Dickey (1920–2008), former Speaker of the New Jersey General Assembly
 Ralph W. E. Donges (1875–1974), Associate Justice of the New Jersey Supreme Court from 1930 to 1948
 Cathy Engelbert (born 1965), CEO of Deloitte, first female CEO of a major U.S. accounting firm
 Bartholomew J. Eustace (1887–1956), Bishop of Camden from 1938 to 1956
 Stink Fisher (born 1970), actor and restaurateur
 Glenn Foley (born 1970), former football quarterback who played in the NFL for the New York Jets and Seattle Seahawks
 James Hoch (born 1967), poet, college professor
 David B. Joslin (born 1936), bishop of the Episcopal Diocese of Central New York from 1992 to 2000
 Michael Landon (1936–1991), television actor and director
 Bob Lassiter (1945–2006), talk radio personality
 Gerald Luongo (born 1938), politician who served one term in the New Jersey General Assembly from 1998 to 2000, where he represented the 4th Legislative District
 Alison Macrina (born 1984), librarian and activist, director of the Library Freedom Project 
 Thomas M. Madden (1907–1976), judge who served on the United States District Court for the District of New Jersey
 Kelly McGillis (born 1957), film actress
 Carl McIntire (1906–2002), founder of and minister in the Bible Presbyterian Church
 Edwin Mills (born 1928), economist, professor emeritus at Northwestern University
 Elmer Myers (1894–1976), professional baseball player
 Ray Narleski (1928–2012), relief pitcher in Major League Baseball who played with the Cleveland Indians (1954–1958) and Detroit Tigers (1959)
 Delia Parr (born 1947), author of historical fiction
 Eddie Picken (1907–1994), early professional basketball player; younger brother of Jim
 Jim Picken (1903–1975), early professional basketball player; older brother of Eddie
 Matthew Quick (born 1976), author of the novel The Silver Linings Playbook
 Bobby Ryan (born 1987), professional hockey player
 Kory Stamper (born 1975), lexicographer and editor for the Merriam-Webster family of dictionaries and the author of Word by Word: The Secret Life of Dictionaries
 Richard Sterban (born 1943), bass singer for The Oak Ridge Boys and former vocalist with Elvis Presley
 Ben Vaughn (born 1956), musician, producer, radio host
 Gary Williams (born 1945), former head coach of the Maryland Terrapins men's basketball team
 Helen Van Pelt Wilson (1901–2003), gardener and author

References

External links

 Collingswood Borough municipal website
 Collingswood Public Schools
 
 School Data for the Collingswood Public Schools, National Center for Education Statistics
 Knight Park website

 
1888 establishments in New Jersey
Boroughs in Camden County, New Jersey
Populated places established in 1888
Walsh Act